Three Rivers College  may refer to:

 Three Rivers Community College (Connecticut), Norwich, Connecticut, US
 Three Rivers College (Missouri), Poplar Bluff, Missouri, US
 Three Rivers Academy Sixth Form College, Surrey, England, UK; a junior college

See also
 Three Rivers (disambiguation)